El Arrayán Airport  is an airport serving the city of Olanchito in Yoro Department, Honduras.

The runway is just north of the city, and also serves as a local road segment. There is high terrain northwest through east of the airport.

See also

 Transport in Honduras
 List of airports in Honduras

References

External links
 OpenStreetMap - Olanchito
 OurAirports - Olanchito
 Skyvector Aeronautical Charts - El Arrayan Airport
 FallingRain - Olanchito
 

Airports in Honduras